Manappuram Finance Ltd, is an Indian non-banking financial company (NBFC) based in Valapad, Thrissur, Kerala. Manappuram has over 4190+ branches across 25 states.

History
The company was founded in 1949 by late V. C. Padmanabhan in Thrissur district. The company commenced its operations at Valappad, mainly with money lending activity on a very modest scale.  

The group's flagship company, MAGFIL, was established in 1992 in the wake of economic reforms launched by the Government of India. Its activity was mainly pawn broking and money lending carried out on a modest scale.

Controversies 
On 14 February 2012, the company announced an immediate compliance to any of RBI's concerns. To enhance governance and better manage growth to the next level, the Board also decided to constitute an independent committee under the chairmanship of Jagdish Capoor (former Deputy Governor of RBI and former Chairman of HDFC Bank). This committee will review relevant aspects of operations, systems, controls and organizational structure, including Board composition and effectiveness.

References

Financial services companies in Thrissur
Financial services companies established in 1949
Indian companies established in 1949
Companies listed on the Bombay Stock Exchange